Malta participated in the Eurovision Song Contest 2021 with the song "" written by Malin Christin, Amanuel Dermont, Nicklas Eklund and Pete Barringer. The song was performed by Destiny Chukunyere, who was due to compete in the 2020 contest with "All of My Love" before the 2020 event's cancellation. The song Destiny would perform at the Eurovision Song Contest, "", was also internally selected and was released to the public on 15 March.

Malta was drawn to compete in the first semi-final of the Eurovision Song Contest which took place on 18 May 2021. Performing as the closing entry during the show in position 16, "" was announced among the top 10 entries of the first semi-final and therefore qualified to compete in the final on 22 May. It was later revealed that Malta placed first out of the 16 participating countries in the semi-final with 325 points. In the final, Malta performed in position 6 and placed seventh out of the 26 participating countries, scoring 255 points.

Background 

Prior to the 2021 contest, Malta had participated in the Eurovision Song Contest thirty-two times since the country's first entry in 1971. Malta briefly competed in the Eurovision Song Contest in the 1970s before withdrawing for sixteen years. The country had, to this point, competed in every contest since returning in 1991. Malta's best placing in the contest thus far was second, which it achieved on two occasions: in 2002 with the song "7th Wonder" performed by Ira Losco and in the 2005 contest with the song "Angel" performed by Chiara. In the 2019 edition, Malta qualified to the final and placed 14th with the song "Chameleon" performed by Michela Pace.

For the 2021 contest, the Maltese national broadcaster, Public Broadcasting Services (PBS), broadcast the event within Malta and organised the selection process for the nation's entry. PBS confirmed their intentions to participate at it on 18 May 2020. For their 2019 and 2020 participations, PBS utilised the talent show format X Factor Malta which resulted in the selection of a winning performer that would subsequently be given an internally selected song to perform at Eurovision.

Before Eurovision

Internal selection

On 18 May 2020, PBS confirmed that Destiny Chukunyere was reselected as Malta's representative for the Eurovision Song Contest 2021. Following the announcement of Destiny as the selected artist, PBS announced a public call which songwriters and composers were able to express their interest in submitting a song for the singer to perform at the Eurovision Song Contest between 26 and 30 October 2020.

On 15 March 2021, PBS announced that Destiny would perform the song "" at the Eurovision Song Contest 2021. "" was written by Malin Christin, Amanuel Dermont, Nicklas Eklund and Pete Barringer. A&Rs of the song were Kevin Lee and Greig Watts with publishing by WiiBii Music, DWB Music and StarLab Publishing. The release of the song and official music video was made available online on the broadcaster's website tvm.com.mt and the official Eurovision Song Contest website Eurovision.tv.

At Eurovision 
The Eurovision Song Contest 2021 took place at Rotterdam Ahoy in Rotterdam, the Netherlands, and consisted of two semi-finals held on the respective dates of 18 and 20 May, and the final on 22 May 2021. According to Eurovision rules, all nations with the exceptions of the host country and the "Big Five" (France, Germany, Italy, Spain and the United Kingdom) are required to qualify from one of two semi-finals in order to compete in the final; the top ten countries from each semi-final progress to the final. The European Broadcasting Union (EBU) split up the competing countries into six different pots based on voting patterns from previous contests, with countries with favourable voting histories put into the same pot. For the 2021 contest, the semi-final allocation draw held for 2020 which was held on 28 January 2020, will be used. Malta was placed into the first semi-final, which was held on 18 May 2021, and was scheduled to perform in the second half of the show. Once all the competing songs for the 2021 contest had been released, the running order for the semi-finals was decided by the shows' producers rather than through another draw, so that similar songs were not placed next to each other. Malta was set to perform last in position 16, following the entry from Ukraine. The two semi-finals and the final were broadcast in Malta on TVM.

Performances 

Malta was the last entry of the first semi-final, performing in position 16. At the end of the first semi-final, Malta was announced as having finished in the top 10 and consequently qualifying for the grand final. It was later revealed that Malta placed first in the semi-final, receiving a total of 325 points: 151 points from the televoting and 174 points from the juries. Following this draw, the shows' producers decided upon the running order of the final, as they had done for the semi-finals. Malta was subsequently placed to perform in position 6, following the entry from Russia and before the entry from Portugal. Being considered by bookmakers as a favourite to win the contest, Malta placed seventh in the final at the end of the show, scoring 255 points: 47 points from the televoting and 208 points from the juries.

Voting 

Voting during the three shows involved each country awarding two sets of points from 1-8, 10 and 12: one from their professional jury and the other from televoting. Each nation's jury consisted of five music industry professionals who are citizens of the country they represent, with a diversity in gender and age represented. The judges assess each entry based on the performances during the second Dress Rehearsal of each show, which takes place the night before each live show, against a set of criteria including: vocal capacity; the stage performance; the song's composition and originality; and the overall impression by the act. Jury members may only take part in panel once every three years, and are obliged to confirm that they are not connected to any of the participating acts in a way that would impact their ability to vote impartially. Jury members should also vote independently, with no discussion of their vote permitted with other jury members. The exact composition of the professional jury, and the results of each country's jury and televoting were released after the grand final; the individual results from each jury member were also released in an anonymised form. The Maltese spokesperson, who announced the points awarded by the Maltese jury during the final, was presenter Stephanie Spiteri.

Points awarded to Malta

Points awarded by Malta

Detailed voting results 
The following members comprised the Maltese jury:
 Kevin Abela
 Annaliz Azzopardi
 Ira Losco
 Sigmund Mifsud
 Michela Pace

References 

2021
Countries in the Eurovision Song Contest 2021
Eurovision